Cambodia Airlines was an airline in Cambodia owned by The Royal Group and PAL Holdings, Inc. of the Philippines. , the airline is no longer operating.

History
Cambodia Airlines was founded in 1997 but its operations ceased in 2005.

In 2013, Philippine's flag carrier, Philippine Airlines, formed a joint venture with The Royal Group of Cambodia by buying a 49% stake in Cambodia Airlines. San Miguel Corporation, a diversified conglomerate in the Philippines, bought a stake in PAL Holdings, Inc. and took control of the management of Philippine Airlines from the Lucio Tan group. The Royal Group of Cambodia owned 100% of Cambodia Airlines before the joint venture. Operations between Manila and Phnom Penh were expected to begin in June 2013 while international flights were set to start in October the same year.

Fleet
The Cambodia Airlines initially leased two Airbus A320 for international flights and two Bombardier Dash 8 for domestic.

References

External links

Defunct airlines of Cambodia
Airlines established in 1997
Airlines disestablished in 2014
2014 disestablishments in Cambodia
Cambodian companies established in 1997